Richard O. Fleischer (December 8, 1917 – March 25, 2006) was an American film director whose career spanned more than four decades, beginning at the height of the Golden Age of Hollywood and lasting through the American New Wave. 

Though he directed films across many genres and styles, he is best known for his big-budget, "tentpole" films, including: 20,000 Leagues Under the Sea (1954), The Vikings (1958), Barabbas (1961), Fantastic Voyage (1966), the musical film Doctor Dolittle (1967), the war epic Tora! Tora! Tora! (1970), the dystopian mystery-thriller Soylent Green (1973), the controversial period drama Mandingo (1975), and the Robert E. Howard sword-and-sorcery films Conan the Destroyer (1984) and Red Sonja (1985). His other directorial credits include: the Academy Award-winning documentary Design for Death (1947), the gritty noir The Narrow Margin (1952), the true-crime dramas Compulsion (1959) and The Boston Strangler (1968), the mob action film The Don Is Dead (1973), the swashbuckler The Prince and the Pauper (1977), the 1980 remake of The Jazz Singer and the horror sequel Amityville 3-D (1983). 

Fleischer worked with many of the top Hollywood stars of his time, including: Kirk Douglas, Robert Mitchum, James Mason, Robert Wagner, Tony Curtis, Louis Jourdan, Jean Hagen, Victor Mature, Richard Egan, Ray Milland, Farley Granger, Orson Welles, Diane Varsi, Anthony Quinn, Stephen Boyd, Rex Harrison, Anthony Newley, Mia Farrow, George C. Scott, Charles Bronson, Richard Attenborough, Charlton Heston, Lee Marvin, Glenda Jackson,  Eddie Deezen and Arnold Schwarzenegger. He was noted for his versatility, able to work in almost any genre under wildly varying conditions and budgets, making him a popular and prolific choice for producers. Though Fleischer was never considered an auteur and was not a highly acclaimed artist, many of his films proved very financially and critically successful, winning accolades and being some of the highest-grossing features of their respective release years.

Early life and education
Richard Fleischer was born to a Jewish family in Brooklyn, the son of Essie (née Goldstein) and animator/producer Max Fleischer, a native of Kraków, Poland. After graduating from Brown University, he went to Yale School of Drama, where he met his future wife, Mary Dickson.

Fleischer served in the U.S. Army during World War II. His film career began in 1942 at the RKO studio, directing shorts, documentaries, and compilations of forgotten silent features, which he called "Flicker Flashbacks". He won an Academy Award as producer of the 1947 documentary Design for Death, co-written by Theodor Geisel (later known as Dr. Seuss), which examined the cultural forces that led to Japan's imperial expansion through World War II.

Career

B movies
Fleischer moved to Los Angeles and was assigned his first feature, Child of Divorce (1946), a vehicle for Sharyn Moffett. It was successful so Fleischer was assigned to Banjo, another Moffett vehicle, which was a disaster.

RKO agreed to loan him to Stanley Kramer and Carl Foreman, who had admired Child of Divorce, to make So This Is New York (1948) for the Kramer Company at Columbia. Back at RKO, Fleischer made The Clay Pigeon, a thriller based on a story by Foreman.

His other early films were taut film noirs, such as: Bodyguard (1948), Follow Me Quietly (1949), Armored Car Robbery (1950) and The Narrow Margin (1952).

Fleischer said he constantly tried to graduate to A pictures during this time. When Norman Krasna and Jerry Wald set up at RKO, they asked Fleischer to see if he could make a film out of any of the film shot for It's All True but he was unable. Another project that did not come to fruition was a film starring Al Jolson.

RKO's owner Howard Hughes was impressed by The Narrow Margin and hired Fleischer to re-write and re-shoot the majority of His Kind of Woman (1952) after he was dissatisfied with the original cut delivered by director John Farrow. Hughes was pleased with the results and agreed to loan Fleischer to Stanley Kramer to make The Happy Time (1952).

Kramer Company
Fleischer was put under contract to the Kramer Company. The Happy Time was successful, and Fleischer was meant to follow it with another for Kramer and Foreman, Full of Life. However the film was never made because the partnership between Foreman and Kramer ended.

He accepted an offer from MGM to make Arena, a rodeo-themed story starring Gig Young and Jean Hagen.

Director of "A" films
Fleischer was chosen by Walt Disney – his father's former rival as a cartoon producer – to direct 20,000 Leagues Under the Sea (1954) starring Kirk Douglas. While in the film's post-production phase, Fleischer received an offer from Dore Schary at MGM to direct Bad Day at Black Rock, but had to turn it down because of the work still required on Leagues.

He directed Violent Saturday (1955), a thriller for Buddy Adler at 20th Century Fox. It was successful, and Fox signed Fleischer to a long-term contract. He worked for this studio for the next 15 years.

20th Century Fox
Fleischer's first film under his new contract with Fox was The Girl in the Red Velvet Swing (1955). He then made Bandido, a Western with Robert Mitchum.

Kirk Douglas hired Fleischer to make The Vikings (1958), which was produced independently by Douglas through his company Brynaprod (and distributed through United Artists) and was another big hit. Back at Fox, Fleischer made Compulsion (1959), a crime drama with Orson Welles for producer Richard D. Zanuck. It was successful and earned Fleischer a Directors Guild Award nomination.

Europe
Fox offered him North to Alaska (1960) with John Wayne, which Fleischer originally agreed to do, but withdrew when he was unhappy with the script. He moved to Paris where Darryl F. Zanuck asked him to make The Ballad of Red Rocks, a vehicle for Zanuck's then-girlfriend Juliette Gréco. The film was not made, but Fleischer directed two other stories for Zanuck starring Gréco: Crack in the Mirror (1960) and The Big Gamble (1961).

Fleischer then signed a contract with Dino De Laurentiis to make Barabbas (1961). After this, he and De Laurentiis announced a series of projects, including Lanny Budd (from a novel by Upton Sinclair), Don Camillo, Salvatore Guliano, Dark Angel and Sacco and Vanzetti (from a script by Edward Anhalt), but none were made. He accepted an offer from Samuel Bronston and Philip Yordan to make The Nightrunners of Bengal in Spain, but this project fell apart when Bronston's empire collapsed.

Return to Hollywood
Back in Hollywood, Richard Zanuck had become head of production at Fox and offered Fleischer Fantastic Voyage (1966). It was a success and revived his Hollywood career.

He was entrusted with Fox's big "roadshow" musical of 1967, Doctor Dolittle (1967), with Rex Harrison. It failed to break even. Most acclaimed was The Boston Strangler (1968), with Tony Curtis.

Che! (1969), a biopic of Che Guevara that starred Omar Sharif, was an expensive flop, as was Tora! Tora! Tora! (1970), an account of the World War II Japanese attack on Pearl Harbor. It was his last film for 20th Century Fox.

1970s
Fleischer traveled to England, where he directed the well received true-crime dramatization, 10 Rillington Place (1971) starring Richard Attenborough and John Hurt. He then replaced John Huston, who had fallen out with star George C. Scott, on The Last Run (1971). The thriller See No Evil (1971) with Mia Farrow followed. Returning to Hollywood, he made The New Centurions (1972) from the novel by Joseph Wambaugh, again starring George C. Scott. 

At MGM, he made the science-fiction movie Soylent Green (1973), with Charlton Heston. Three action films followed: The Don Is Dead (1973), with Anthony Quinn, plus two for Walter Mirisch: The Spikes Gang (1974), with Lee Marvin, and Mr. Majestyk (1974), with Charles Bronson, written by Elmore Leonard.

Fleischer was reunited with De Laurentiis for the successful though controversial Mandingo (1975). The Incredible Sarah (1976), a British biopic of Sarah Bernhardt with Glenda Jackson, came next.

Fleischer earned a reputation as a reliable journeyman and "replacement director", filling in when a project's original director was fired by a producer for creative differences. These included Huston in The Last Run and Michael Campus for Mandingo.

The Prince and the Pauper (1977) was a version of the Mark Twain novel that featured Heston, Harrison and Scott in its cast. Fleischer was hired to replace Richard Sarafian on Ashanti (1979), starring Michael Caine, which turned out to be a flop. He received another call to replace a director, in this case Sidney J. Furie, on The Jazz Singer (1980), an unsuccessful attempt to make a film star out of Neil Diamond.

Later career
Tough Enough (1983) was about the Toughman Contest starring Dennis Quaid. He made three more for De Laurentiis: Amityville 3-D (1983), Conan the Destroyer (1984) and Red Sonja (1985). The latter two were adaptations of Robert E. Howard's Hyborian Age stories, both starring Arnold Schwarzenegger.

His final theatrical feature was Million Dollar Mystery (1987).

Fleischer Studios
Fleischer was chairman of Fleischer Studios, which today handles the licensing of Betty Boop and Koko the Clown. In June 2005, he released his memoirs of his father's career in Out of the Inkwell: Max Fleischer and the Animation Revolution.

Death and legacy
Fleischer's 1993 autobiography Just Tell Me When to Cry, described his many difficulties with actors, writers and producers. He died in his sleep at the age of 89 after having been in failing health.

Japanese film director Kiyoshi Kurosawa expresses admiration for Fleischer.

Filmography

Short films

Source:

Books
 Fleischer, Richard, Just Tell Me When to Cry (Carroll and Graf, 1993)
 Fleischer, Richard, Out of the Inkwell: Max Fleischer and the Animation Revolution (University Press of Kentucky, 2005)

Awards and honors

Notes

References

External links 
 
 
 

1916 births
2006 deaths
Film directors from New York City
Science fiction film directors
American people of Austrian-Jewish descent
American people of Polish-Jewish descent
People from Brooklyn
Fleischer family
Jewish American writers
Brown University alumni
Yale University alumni
Yale School of Drama alumni
Directors of Best Documentary Feature Academy Award winners
20th Century Studios people